TBC1D12 is a protein with a conserved TBC domain that in humans is encoded by the TBC1D12 gene.

References

Further reading